Trond Soleng (born 28 February 1973) is a retired Norwegian football midfielder.

Hailing from Mortensnes and Vesterli in Tromsø, Soleng got one league game and two cup games for Tromsø IL. He then played three seasons for Odds BK, as well as spells in Sweden and Denmark. He returned to Tromsø and IF Skarp in 2001, but soon retired after prolonged injury problems.

He settled as a physiotherapist in Tromsø.

References

1973 births
Living people
Sportspeople from Tromsø
Norwegian footballers
Tromsø IL players
Odds BK players
Norwegian First Division players
Eliteserien players
Norwegian expatriate footballers
Expatriate footballers in Sweden
Norwegian expatriate sportspeople in Sweden
Boldklubben Frem players
Fremad Amager players
Expatriate men's footballers in Denmark
Norwegian expatriate sportspeople in Denmark
Association football midfielders